Jožef Tertei (born 5 May 1960) is a retired wrestler who competed for Yugoslavia. He won a bronze medal at the 1984 Summer Olympics and finished in fifth place at the 1988 Summer Olympics in the heavyweight class (under 100 kg).

He won a silver medal at the 1983 World Wrestling Championships as well as three medals at European championships in 1982, 1986 and 1988, including a gold medal in 1986.

References

External links
 

1960 births
Living people
Serbian male sport wrestlers
Olympic wrestlers of Yugoslavia
Wrestlers at the 1984 Summer Olympics
Wrestlers at the 1988 Summer Olympics
Yugoslav male sport wrestlers
Olympic bronze medalists for Yugoslavia
People from Senta
World Wrestling Championships medalists
Medalists at the 1984 Summer Olympics
European Wrestling Championships medalists